T-vertices is a term used in computer graphics to describe a problem that can occur during mesh refinement or mesh simplification.  The most common case occurs in naive implementations of continuous level of detail, where a finer-level mesh is "sewn" together with a coarser-level mesh by simply aligning the finer vertices on the edges of the coarse polygons.  The result is a continuous mesh, however due to the nature of the z-buffer and certain lighting algorithms such as Gouraud shading, visual artifacts can often be detected.

Some modeling algorithms such as subdivision surfaces will fail when a model contains T-vertices.

References

External links

Computer graphics